The 2018–19 Serbian League East was the 16th season of one of the four third level leagues in Serbian football. The league consists of 18 teams. A higher level of competition is the First League, while the lower three Zone Leagues are West, East and South.

Clubs

Jagodina withdrew from the Serbian League East for financial difficulties and inability to register players, and Tabane will play instead, from the full name FK Tabane-Jagodina.

Stadiums and locations

League table

Results

References

External links
 srbijasport.net
 fsris.org.rs

Serbian League East seasons
3
Serb